Don't Think Twice may refer to:

Don't Think Twice, 2016 film
Don't Think Twice (album), 1970 album by Waylon Jennings
"Don't Think Twice", English-language version of the Utada Hikaru song "Chikai"
"Don't Think Twice, It's All Right", song by Bob Dylan